The coats of arms of the 15 counties of Estonia are presented below.

Military

Estonian Land Forces

Estonian Navy

Estonian Air Force

Counties

Harju County

Harju County

Ida-Viru County

Jõgeva County

Järva County

Lääne County

Lääne-Viru County

Põlva County

Pärnu County

Rapla County

Saare County

Tartu County

Valga County

Viljandi County

Võru County

Colleges

See also
 Flags of Estonian counties

Estonia
Estonia geography-related lists